The geography of Puerto Rico consists of an archipelago located between the Caribbean Sea and the North Atlantic Ocean, east of the Dominican Republic or Hispaniola, west of the Virgin Islands and north of Venezuela. The main island of Puerto Rico is the smallest and most eastern of the Greater Antilles. Various smaller islands and cays, including Vieques, Culebra, Mona, Desecheo, and Caja de Muertos comprise the remainder of the archipelago with only Culebra and Vieques being inhabited year-round. Mona is uninhabited through large parts of the year except for employees of the Puerto Rico Department of Natural Resources.

It is mostly mountainous with large coastal areas in the north and south regions of the island. Some popular beaches on the north-west side of the island are Jobos Beach, Maria's Beach, Domes Beach and Sandy Beach. The main mountainous range is called the Cordillera Central (Central Mountain Range). The highest elevation point of Puerto Rico, Cerro de Punta, is located in this range. The capital, San Juan, is located on the main island's north coast.

Physical geography
The archipelago of Puerto Rico is located between the Caribbean Sea and the North Atlantic ocean, east of the Dominican Republic and west of the Virgin Islands. Located in the northeastern Caribbean Sea, Puerto Rico was key to the Spanish Empire since the early years of exploration, conquest and colonization of the New World.

The topography of the main island is divided into three major regions: the mountainous region, which includes the Cordillera Central, the Sierra de Luquillo, and the Sierra de Cayey; the coastal plains; and the northern karst region. The Cordillera Central extends through the entire island, dividing it into the northern and southern regions. The mountain region accounts for approximately 60%  of the land area.

The archipelago of Culebra, located east of Puerto Rico, north of Vieques, and west of the Virgin Islands, is composed of the main island of Culebra and 28 uninhabited islets. Mainly mountainous, the island of Culebra possesses world-renowned beaches.

Climate

Located in the tropics, Puerto Rico enjoys an average temperature of  throughout the year. The seasons do not change very drastically. The temperature in the south is usually a few degrees higher than the north and temperatures in the central interior mountains are always cooler than the rest of the island. The dry season spans from December to April while the wet season coincides with the Atlantic hurricane season from May to November.

Rivers and lakes

Puerto Rico has lakes (none of them natural) and more than 50 rivers. Most of these rivers are born in the Cordillera Central, Puerto Rico's principal mountain range located across the center of the island. The rivers in the north of the island are bigger and with higher flow capacity than those of the south. The south is thus drier and hotter than the north. These rivers make up 60 watersheds throughout the island, where over 95% of the runoff goes back to sea.

Flora and fauna

As of 1998, 239 plants, 16 birds and 39 amphibians/reptiles have been discovered that are endemic to the archipelago of Puerto Rico. The majority of these (234, 12 and 33 respectively) are found on the main island. The most recognizable endemic species and a symbol of Puerto Rican pride are the coquis (Eleutherodactylus spp.), small frogs easily recognized by the sound from which they get their name. El Yunque National Forest, a tropical rainforest, is home to the majority (13 of 16) of species of coqui. It is also home to more than 240 plants, 26 of which are endemic, and 50 bird species, including the critically endangered Puerto Rican amazon (Amazona vittata).

Forests
Forests of Puerto Rico are well represented by the flora of the Luquillo Experimental Forest (LEF), a Long Term Ecological Research Network site managed by the United States Forest Service and University of Puerto Rico. At this site, there are four main life zones, delineated on the basis of temperature and precipitation (Holdridge System), in the Sierra de Luquillo: subtropical wet and subtropical rain forests are found at low and mid elevations, lower montane rain and lower montane wet forests at high elevations. There is also an area of subtropical moist forest at low elevations on the southwest slope.

Tabonuco trees are especially large on ridges, where they are firmly rooted in the rocky substrate and connected by root grafts with each other. There are about 168 tree species in the tabonuco forest.

Soils are saturated and root mats above the soil are common. There are some 53 tree species in this forest type. At this same elevation, but in especially steep and wet areas, is palm forest, heavily dominated by the sierra palm tree (Prestoea montana). Patches of palm forest are also found in saturated riparian areas in the tabonuco forest. The palm forest reaches about 15 m in height.

Here the trees are covered with epiphytic mosses and vascular plants, especially bromeliads, and these also cover large areas of the ground. Ascending the Luquillo mountains through these forest types, the average tree height and diameter, number of tree species, and basal area (cross sectional area of tree stems) tend to decrease, while stem density increases.

There are more than 89 tree species in the LEF. The most common are Prestoea acuminata, Casearia arborea, Dacryodes excelsa, Manilkara bidentata, Inga laurina, and Sloanea berteroana. Common shrub species are Palicourea croceoides, Psychotria berteriana, and Piper glabrescens. Grasses, ferns, and forbs are frequent on the ground, especially in canopy gaps; epiphytes are fairly common, and vines are uncommon.

Puerto Rican dry forests are dominated by plants in the families Rubiaceae, Euphorbiaceae, and Myrtaceae. In this regard they are similar to Jamaican dry forests, but differ sharply from dry forests on the mainland of South and Central America, which are dominated by Fabaceae and Bignoniaceae.

Mario Javier Fernandez-Vega is a Puerto Rican forester who uses silvicultural techniques. Fernandez is currently developing cutting edge forestry methods known as the "Borincano Model". The model capitalizes on the diversity of ecological niches in Puerto Rican forests and native disturbance regimes to formulate practices uniquely suited to the forests of the territory. About his model Fernandez has been known to comment, "Soy de aquí como el coquí" (I am from here just like the coqui), a common patriotic axiom that is used to demonstrate their native ties to the island. The coqui and its unique vocalizations are indigenous to the island of Puerto Rico. However, there are thriving populations of coquis that, like the people of Puerto Rico, have been transported to the island of Hawaii. The coqui is viewed as an ecological menace in Hawaii where its song of co kee co kee is found to be an irritant by many. Needless to say that efforts to eradicate its presence in Hawaii is not a popular issue among Puerto Ricans.

Topography

Puerto Rico is mostly mountainous with large coastal areas in the north and south. The main mountain range is called "La Cordillera Central" (The Central Range). The highest elevation in Puerto Rico, Cerro de Punta , is located in this range.

Geology

Puerto Rico is composed of Cretaceous to Eocene volcanic and plutonic rocks, which are overlain by younger Oligocene to recent carbonates and other sedimentary rocks. Most of the caverns and karst topography on the island occurs in the northern Oligocene to recent carbonates. The oldest rocks are approximately 190 million years old (Jurassic) and are located at Sierra Bermeja in the southwest part of the island. These rocks may represent part of the oceanic crust and are believed to come from the Pacific Ocean realm. Puerto Rico lies at the boundary between the Caribbean and North American plates. This means that it is currently being deformed by the tectonic stresses caused by the interaction of these plates. These stresses may cause earthquakes and tsunamis. These seismic events, along with landslides, represent some of the most dangerous geologic hazards in the island and in the northeastern Caribbean. The most recent major earthquake occurred on October 11, 1918, with seismic moment estimated at 7.5 on the moment magnitude scale. It originated off the coast of Aguadilla and was accompanied by a tsunami.

Political geography

As an unincorporated territory of the United States, Puerto Rico does not have any first-order administrative divisions as defined by the U.S. Government, but there are 78 municipalities at the second level. Municipalities are further subdivided into barrios, and those into sectors. Each municipality has a mayor and a municipal legislature elected for a 4-year term.

History
The first municipality (previously called "town") of Puerto Rico, San Juan, was founded in 1521. In the 16th century two more municipalities were established, Coamo (1570) and San Germán (1570). Three more municipalities were established in the 17th century. These were Arecibo (1614), Aguada (1692) and Ponce (1692). The 18th and 19th century saw an increase in settlement in Puerto Rico with 30 municipalities being established in the 18th century and 34 more in the 19th century. Only six municipalities were founded in the 20th century with the last, Florida, being founded in 1971.

Under Spanish rule, as of the 1880s, Puerto Rico was subdivided into regional districts (or "departamentos") that contained smaller ayuntamientes (municipalities).

References

Further reading

 Living with the Puerto Rico Shore, David M. Bush, Richard M. T. Webb, José González Liboy, Duke University Press, 1995
 Atlas de la Historia de Puerto Rico, Dr. Arturo Santana, Rafael Torrech, Editorial Cordillera, 1988, 
 The Geographic Regions of Puerto Rico, Rafael Picó, 1950, OCLC number 1649057
 Nueva Geografía de Puerto Rico: Física, Económica y Social, Rafael Picó, 1975
 Elementos de Geografía de Puerto Rico, Dr. José F. Cadilla, Ángel Cruz, Sara Diez-Trigo, 1988